Lipniki may refer to:

Lipniki, Kuyavian-Pomeranian Voivodeship (north-central Poland)
Lipniki, Lublin Voivodeship (east Poland)
Lipniki, Podlaskie Voivodeship (north-east Poland)
Lipniki, Garwolin County in Masovian Voivodeship (east-central Poland)
Lipniki, Maków County in Masovian Voivodeship (east-central Poland)
Lipniki, Ostrołęka County in Masovian Voivodeship (east-central Poland)
Lipniki, Sierpc County in Masovian Voivodeship (east-central Poland)
Lipniki, Węgrów County in Masovian Voivodeship (east-central Poland)
Lipniki, Opole Voivodeship (south-west Poland)
Lipniki, Bartoszyce County in Warmian-Masurian Voivodeship (north Poland)
Lipniki, Szczytno County in Warmian-Masurian Voivodeship (north Poland)
Lipniki, Wołyń Voivodeship, Volhynia

See also
Jonathan Lipnicki